Kamila Wieczorek (born 10 March 1997) is a Polish ice hockey forward and member of the Polish national ice hockey team, currently playing in the European Women's Hockey League (EWHL) with Silesian Metropolis Katowice and in the Polska Liga Hokeja Kobiet (PLHK) with the women's representative team of Unia Oświęcim.

Wieczorek has represented Poland in the lower divisions at seven IIHF Women's World Championships – the Division II Group A level in 2013, 2014, 2015, and 2016, and the Division I Group B level in 2017, 2018, and 2019. As a junior player with the Polish national under-18 team, she participated in the Division I Qualification tournaments of the IIHF U18 Women's World Championship in 2014 and 2015.

References

External links
 

1997 births
Living people
People from Oświęcim
Polish ice hockey right wingers
Women's ice hockey forwards
Malmö Redhawks players
European Women's Hockey League players
Polish expatriate sportspeople in Switzerland
Polish expatriate sportspeople in Sweden
Expatriate ice hockey players in Switzerland
Expatriate ice hockey players in Sweden
Polish expatriate ice hockey people
Expatriate ice hockey players in Slovakia
Expatriate ice hockey players in Denmark
Polish expatriate sportspeople in Denmark
Polish expatriate sportspeople in Slovakia
Sportspeople from Lesser Poland Voivodeship